Autophila libanotica is a moth of the family Erebidae first described by Otto Staudinger in 1901. It is found from Turkey to Turkmenistan, Afghanistan, Pakistan Iran, northern Greece, Lebanon and Israel.

There is one generation per year. Adults are on wing from June to October.

Subspecies
Autophila libanotica libanotica
Autophila libanotica osthelderi

External links

Lepiforum e.V.

Toxocampina
Moths of Europe
Moths of Asia
Taxa named by Otto Staudinger
Moths described in 1901